Mubi may refer to:

 Mubi (streaming service) a film streaming platform
 Mubi (town), a town in Nigeria
 Mubi North, a local government area
 Mubi South, a local government area
 Mubi language, a language of Chad
 Mubi languages, a group of languages

See also
 
 MUBY
 MUBE